The Trepassey Formation is a geologic formation that crops out in Newfoundland. It preserves fossils dating back to the Ediacaran period.

See also

 List of fossiliferous stratigraphic units in Newfoundland and Labrador

References

 

Ediacaran Newfoundland and Labrador